Pete Brown (February 2, 1935 – May 1, 2015) was an American professional golfer who is best known as the first African American to win a PGA Tour event with his win at the Waco Turner Open.

Early life
Brown was born in Port Gibson, Mississippi and grew up in Jackson, Mississippi. He started in golf as a caddy at the municipal course in his hometown. He suffered from non-paralytic polio in the late 1950s but recovered and resumed playing competitive golf.

Career
He turned professional in 1954, winning the Negro National Open consecutively in 1961 and 1962.  Brown received his PGA Tour card in 1963. He was not the first African American to obtain his PGA players card; that honor belonged to Charlie Sifford. Brown's victory at the 1964 Waco Turner Open did, however, earn him a place in history as the first African American to win a PGA event. He played on the PGA Tour for 17 years and posted a second tour win at the 1970 Andy Williams-San Diego Open Invitational in a playoff over Tony Jacklin.

Brown played on the Senior PGA Tour (now Champions Tour) beginning in 1985. His best finishes were a pair of T-6s  in 1985 at the Senior PGA Tour Roundup and the MONY Syracuse Senior Classic.

In 2021, Brown was inducted into the Mississippi Sports Hall of Fame.

Personal life
Brown and his wife, Margaret, are the parents of six daughters.  He was the head pro at Madden Golf Course in Dayton, Ohio for more than 20 years. He lived in Evans, Georgia from 2012 to 2015.

Brown died in Augusta, Georgia on May 1, 2015 at the age of 80.

Professional wins (14)

PGA Tour wins (2)

PGA Tour playoff record (1–1)

Other wins (12)
Four time USG (Negro) National Open Champion
Four time Long Star Open Champion
Three time North & South Champion
1962 Michigan Open

References

External links

American male golfers
African-American golfers
PGA Tour golfers
Golfers from Mississippi
People from Port Gibson, Mississippi
Sportspeople from Jackson, Mississippi
Sportspeople from Dayton, Ohio
People from Evans, Georgia
1935 births
2015 deaths
20th-century African-American sportspeople